Garabonc is a village in Zala County, Hungary. It is about 110 miles to the west of Budapest.

References

External links 
 Street map 

Populated places in Zala County